Agnetha Collection is a Swedish compilation album released in 1986 by Agnetha Fältskog.

Track listing
"Mina ögon"
"Dom har Glömt"
"Here For Your Love"
"Gulleplutt"
"Var Det Med Dej?"
"Framför Svenska Sommaren"
"Zigenarvän"
"Om Tårar Vore Guld"
"Många Gånger än"
"Dröm är dröm Och Saga Saga"
"Vart Ska Min Kärlek Föra?"
"Så Glad Som Dina ögon"
"S.O.S."
"Doktorn!"
"Tack För En Underbar Vanlig Dag"
"När Du Tar Mig I Din Famn"

Agnetha Fältskog compilation albums
1986 compilation albums